Neetzow is a village and a former municipality in the Vorpommern-Greifswald district, in Mecklenburg-Vorpommern, Germany. Since 1 January 2014, it is part of the municipality Neetzow-Liepen.

References

External links

Official website of Neetzow (German)
Neetzow Castle website (German)

Former municipalities in Mecklenburg-Western Pomerania